N-Acetylaspartic acid, or ''N''-acetylaspartate (NAA), is a derivative of aspartic acid with a formula of C6H9NO5  and a molecular weight of 175.139.

NAA is the second-most-concentrated molecule in the brain after the amino acid glutamate.  It is detected in the adult brain in neurons, oligodendrocytes and myelin and is synthesized in the mitochondria from the amino acid aspartic acid and acetyl-coenzyme A.

Function 
The various functions served by NAA are under investigation, but the primary proposed functions include:

 Neuronal osmolyte that is involved in fluid balance in the brain
 Source of acetate for lipid and myelin synthesis in oligodendrocytes, the glial cells that myelinate neuronal axons
 Precursor for the synthesis of the neuronal dipeptide N-Acetylaspartylglutamate
 Contributor to energy production from the amino acid glutamate in neuronal mitochondria

In the brain, NAA was thought to be present predominantly in neuronal cell bodies, where it acts as a neuronal marker, but it is also free to diffuse throughout neuronal fibers.

Applications 
However, the recent discovery of a higher concentration of NAA in myelin and oligodendrocytes than in neurons raises questions about the validity of the use of NAA as a neuronal marker. NAA gives off the largest signal in magnetic resonance spectroscopy of the human brain. The levels measured there are decreased in numerous neuropathological conditions ranging from brain injury to stroke to Alzheimer's disease. This fact makes NAA a potential diagnostic molecule for doctors treating patients with brain damage or disease.

NAA may be a marker of creativity. High NAA levels in the hippocampus are related to better working memory performance in humans.

NAA may function as a neurotransmitter in the brain by acting on metabotropic glutamate receptors.

See also 
 Aspartoacylase
 Canavan disease

References

Further reading

External links 
  GeneReviews/NCBI/UW/NIH entry on Canavan disease

Amino acid derivatives